Podob ( or ) is a small settlement in the Municipality of Slovenske Konjice in eastern Slovenia. The area is part of the traditional region of Styria. The municipality is now included in the Savinja Statistical Region.

To the north of the settlement a prehistoric hill fort has been identified. It dates to the Early Iron Age.

References

External links
Podob at Geopedia

Populated places in the Municipality of Slovenske Konjice